2008 Spa-Francorchamps GP2 Series round was the ninth and penultimate round of the 2008 GP2 Series season. It was held on 6 September and 7, 2008 at Circuit de Spa-Francorchamps near the village of Francorchamps, Wallonia, Belgium. The race was used as a support race to the 2008 Belgian Grand Prix.

Classification

Qualifying

Feature race

Sprint race

References

Gp2 Round, 2008
Spa-Francorchamps